Jelena Dokic and Nadia Petrova were the defending champions, and successfully defended their title, defeating Rika Fujiwara and Ai Sugiyama in the final, 6–3, 6–2.

Seeds

Draw

Draw

Qualifying

Seeds

Qualifiers

  Greta Arn /  Marie-Gaïané Mikaelian

Lucky losers
  Jill Craybas /  Maja Murić

References
 Main Draw (ITF)
 Qualifying Draw (ITF)

Generali Ladies Linz - Singles